Open Season is a 2006 American computer-animated adventure comedy film, directed by Jill Culton and Roger Allers from a screenplay by Steve Bencich, Ron J. Friedman, and Nat Mauldin with a screen story by Culton and co-director Anthony Stacchi from an original story by Steve Moore and John B. Carls. The film stars the voices of Martin Lawrence, Ashton Kutcher, Gary Sinise, Debra Messing, Billy Connolly, Jon Favreau, Georgia Engel, Jane Krakowski, Gordon Tootoosis, and Patrick Warburton. Its plot follows Boog, a domesticated grizzly bear, who teams up with a one-antlered mule deer named Elliot and other woodland animals to defeat human hunters.

Open Season was produced by Sony Pictures Animation as its debut film, and was released to theaters by Columbia Pictures under Sony Pictures Releasing on September 29, 2006. It has also been released in the IMAX 3D format. A video game for the film was released on multiple platforms.

Despite receiving mixed reviews from both film critics and audiences, it was a box office success, earning $200.8 million on an $85 million budget. The film was followed by three direct-to-video sequels: Open Season 2 (2008), Open Season 3 (2010), and Open Season: Scared Silly (2015).

Plot

In the small town of Timberline, a 900-pound (400 kg) grizzly bear named Boog enjoys a captive but pampered existence and spends his days as the star attraction of the town's nature show, while at night lives in the garage of park ranger Beth, who has raised Boog since he was a cub. One day, the hunting fanatic Shaw drives into Timberline with a one-antlered deer named Elliot strapped to the hood of his truck. Boog frees him and Elliot becomes convinced that they are friends. That night, Elliot finds Boog sleeping comfortably in the garage, tells him to be "free" from his garage captivity, and introduces him to sweet temptations he has never known.

When Boog becomes sick from eating too many candy bars, events quickly spiral out of control as the two raid a convenience store. Elliot escapes, but Boog is caught by Beth's friend Gordy, the town's sheriff. The next morning, Elliot is being chased by Shaw, and goes to Boog for help at the nature show. Boog tries to get rid of him, and the audience mistakes him for attacking Elliot and goes into a panic. Beth shoots both animals with a tranquilizer gun just before Shaw fires his own gun; Shaw flees before Gordy can arrest him. Realizing Boog is too threatening in the town, Beth relocates him and Elliot into the Timberline National Forest two days before open season, but they are relocated above the waterfalls, where they will be legally safe from hunters. 

Lacking outdoor survival skills, Boog reluctantly takes Elliot as his guide to get him back home to reunite with Beth. They encounter unwelcoming forest animals, including skunks Maria and Rosie, ducks Serge and Deni, various panic-stricken rabbits, the Scottish-accented squirrel McSquizzy and his loyal gang of fellow acorn-throwing squirrels, beaver Reilly and his construction worker team, a porcupine named Buddy who is in search of a friend, and Elliot's herd that includes Ian, the leader, and Giselle, a doe that Elliot is in love with. It is revealed that Ian banished Elliot from the herd for being a loser. Eventually, Boog and Elliot start to bond after realizing they are both outcasts, and Boog considers letting Elliot stay with him when they get back. 

The next day, Elliot attempts to lead Boog out of the forest, but it becomes evident he has no clue where they are going. The two are confronted by Shaw and accidentally destroy Reilly's dam trying to get away, causing a flash flood which sends the animals and Shaw plummeting down the waterfall into the hunting grounds. At first, everyone blames Boog, who accuses Elliot of lying to him about knowing the way home. Elliot admits he thought that if Boog spent time with him, he would befriend him. Boog angrily storms off, but unwittingly ends up in Shaw's log cabin, where he is discovered by Shaw. Boog escapes to a nearby road and happens upon the glowing lights of Timberline. Instead of returning home, Boog rallies the animals to defend themselves using their natural skills. They scavenge supplies from an RV owned by a couple named Bob and Bobbie, who are looking for Bigfoot, while their pet dachshund Mr. Weenie joins the forest animals.

The next day, Boog leads a revolution against the hunters, sending them running after McSquizzy blows up their trucks with a propane tank ignited by an emergency flare. Shaw returns for a final showdown and shoots Elliot, prompting Boog to furiously confront Shaw and tie him up with his own gun. Boog rushes to Elliot, who survived with a second broken antler. The forest animals thank Boog for his help and take out their vengeance on Shaw by smothering him with honey and pillow feathers, sending him fleeing into the woods. Beth later returns in a helicopter to take Boog back home, but Boog, realizing how much the experience has changed him and all the friends he has now, decides to stay in the forest with Beth's blessing.

In a mid-credits scene, Shaw is captured by Bob and Bobbie who mistake him for Bigfoot.

Cast

Production

The ideas for Open Season came from cartoonist Steve Moore, who is known for his comic strip In the Bleachers. Moore and producer John Carls submitted the story to Sony in June 2002, and the film immediately went into development. On February 29, 2004, Sony Pictures Animation announced the beginning of the production on Open Season, its first CGI animated film.

The film location was inspired by the towns of Sun Valley, Idaho and McCall, Idaho, and the Sawtooth National Forest. References to the Lawn Lake, Colorado, Dam flood, Longs Peak, and other points of interest in the area are depicted in the film.

The rendering services used were Hewlett-Packard and Alias Maya.

The Sony animation team developed a digital tool called shapers that allowed the animators to reshape the character models into stronger poses and silhouettes and subtle distortions such as squash, stretch, and smears, typical of traditional, hand drawn animation.

To choose the voice cast, Culton blindly listened to audition tapes, unknowingly picking Lawrence and Kutcher for the lead roles. Their ability to improvise significantly contributed to the creative process. "They really became meshed with the characters", said Culton. Until the film's premiere, Lawrence and Kutcher never met during production.

Reception

Critical response
On Rotten Tomatoes, the film has an approval rating of 48% based on 101 reviews with an average rating of 5.4/10. The site's consensus reads: "Open Season is a clichéd palette of tired jokes and CGI animal shenanigans that have been seen multiple times this cinematic year." On Metacritic, the film has a score of 49 out of 100 based on 18 critics, indicating "mixed or average reviews". Audiences polled by CinemaScore gave the film an average grade of "A−" on an A+ to F scale.

Kevin Smith gave the film a thumbs up during an appearance as a guest critic on Ebert and Roeper, saying: "If your kids like poop jokes as much as I do, Open Season will put a big smile on their faces". However, Richard Roeper gave the film a thumbs down, saying, "It's just okay, the animation is uninspired".

Box office
Open Season opened number one with $23 million on its opening weekend. It grossed $88.6 million in the United States and $112.2 million in foreign countries, making $200.8 million worldwide. The film was released in the United Kingdom on October 13, 2006, and opened at number three, behind The Departed and The Devil Wears Prada.

Accolades
The film was nominated for six Annie Awards, including Best Animated Feature (lost to Cars), Best Animated Effects, Best Character Design in a Feature Production, Best Production Design in a Feature Production, and Best Storyboarding in a Feature Production.

Home media
Open Season was released on DVD, Blu-ray, and UMD Video on January 30, 2007. It includes an animated short called Boog and Elliot's Midnight Bun Run. The film was later released to 3D Blu-ray on November 16, 2010.

Video game

A video game based on the film was released on September 18, 2006, for PlayStation 2, Xbox, Xbox 360, Nintendo DS, Nintendo GameCube, Game Boy Advance, PlayStation Portable, and Microsoft Windows. For Wii, it was released on November 19, 2006, together with the console's launch.

Music

The soundtrack includes an original film score by Ramin Djawadi and several original songs by Paul Westerberg, formerly of The Replacements. Rolling Stone gave the film's soundtrack three stars out of five, as did AllMusic.

Open Season—Original Motion Picture Soundtrack (10″ LP) includes three songs that did not appear on the soundtrack CD: an alternative version of "I Belong", Paul Westerberg's own version of "Wild as I Wanna Be", and Reyli's "Tú eres el amor", which played during the credits in the Latin American Spanish version of the film. In the dubbing of the same language, Reyli also performed the voice of Boog.

Sequels

Open Season was followed by three direct-to-video sequels: Open Season 2 (2008), Open Season 3 (2010), and  Open Season: Scared Silly (2015). A majority of the characters' voices were recast, with Michelle Murdocca (Maria) being the only cast member to appear in all sequels.

References

External links

 
 
 
 
 
 
 

2006 films
2006 animated films
2006 computer-animated films
2006 3D films
3D animated films
2000s American animated films
American 3D films
American computer-animated films
Animated films about bears
Columbia Pictures animated films
Columbia Pictures films
Films scored by Ramin Djawadi
Films directed by Roger Allers
Films produced by Michelle Murdocca
Films set in forests
Grizzly bears in popular culture
IMAX films
 
Sony Pictures Animation films
2006 directorial debut films
2000s English-language films